David George Murray (born 7 March 1995 in Port Elizabeth, South Africa) is a South African rugby union player, currently with the  in Currie Cup rugby. His regular position is loosehead prop.

Rugby career

2013–14: Craven Week and Under-19 rugby

Murray earned his first provincial selection in 2013, when he represented the Eastern Province Country Districts at the premier schools tournament in South Africa, the Under-18 Craven Week, held in Polokwane. Just two months later, he was also included in the  squad that participated in Group B of the 2013 Under-19 Provincial Championship. He started the final two matches of the regular season as they finished in third position to secure a semi-final spot.

He again represented Eastern Province U19 in the 2014 Under-19 Provincial Championship.

2015–: Under-21 and Currie Cup rugby

Murray progressed to the  team in 2015 and he immediately established himself as a first team regular, starting all twelve of their matches in Group A of the Under-21 Provincial Championship. However, the team – who were promoted from Group B at the end of the 2014 season – struggled at their new level and won just one of their matches, finishing bottom of the log.

References

South African rugby union players
Living people
1995 births
Rugby union players from Port Elizabeth
Rugby union props
Eastern Province Elephants players
Alumni of St. Andrew's College, Grahamstown